Dale Watson (born October 7, 1962) is an American country/Texas country singer, guitarist, songwriter, and self-published author based in Marshall, Texas. He champions "Ameripolitan" as a new genre of original music and has positioned himself as a tattooed, stubbornly independent outsider who is interested in recording authentic country music. As a result, he has become a favorite of critics and alt-country fans.

Biography

Watson was born in Birmingham, Alabama, and moved outside of Wilmington, NC when he was less than a year old. The family moved to Pasadena, Texas, in 1977. He was  one of four boys. Watson's father and his brother, Jim, were both musically inclined and guided what have become his longstanding musical influences. Watson began writing his own songs at age 12, making his first recording two years later. Soon after, Watson became an emancipated minor. By day he went to school and by night he played local Houston clubs and honky-tonks with Jim, in an aggregation called The Classic Country Band.

He moved to Los Angeles in 1988 on the advice of Rosie Flores and soon joined the house band at North Hollywood's now-legendary alt-country venue "The Palomino Club". He recorded two singles for Curb Records in 1990 and 1991, "One Tear at a Time" and "You Pour It On and I Pour It Down", and appeared on the third volume of the compilation series A Town South of Bakersfield in 1992. Not long after, he moved to Nashville and spent some time writing songs for the Gary Morris publishing company where his first daughter was born.

Watson relocated to Austin, Texas, where he formed a backing band called The Lone Stars. He scored a deal with Hightone and released his debut album, Cheatin' Heart Attack, in 1995. It was greeted with enormous acclaim for the vitality Watson brought to his vintage-style material and performances and also featured a dig at mainstream country in "Nashville Rash". Follow-up album Blessed Or Damned appeared in 1996 and continued in a similar vein, as did 1997's I Hate These Songs. His next release, The Truckin' Sessions, appeared on Koch in 1998 and was devoted entirely to that distinct country subgenre of truck-driving songs and soon after, his second daughter was born. Watson attended truck driving school about the time his first album came out and later obtained his commercial driver's license; he often drives the band bus when on tour.

The singer is also featured in the Zalman King documentary "Crazy Again", chronicling his (Watson's) breakdown after his girlfriend Terri Herbert died in a car accident in September 2000. Every Song I Write Is For You was released in 2001 as a tribute album.

After going on hiatus from music in 2004, he moved to Baltimore, Maryland to be closer to his daughters, Raquel Cain and Dalynn Grace. Dalynn appeared alongside Luke Wilson, Johnny Knoxville and Knoxville's daughter Madison in Watson's 2007 video for "Hollywood Hillbilly"  . Both Daughters are in pursuit of acting careers as both have attended UT Austin for theatre.

Watson returned to Austin in July 2006 and resumed playing regular gigs, including Sundays at "Ginny's Little Longhorn Saloon" and a Monday night residence at "The Continental Club". He is also a regular performer on the Grand Ole Opry. He also was the focus of a 2007 bio-picture, "Austin Angel".

In 2011 Watson released a music video about Tiger Airways Australia after the company charged him $500 to transport a box of CDs which they then lost and initially refused to pay compensation.

In 2012 he starred in Stephen King and John Mellencamp's musical, "Ghost Brothers of Darkland County" and released The Sun Sessions (Red House Records).

In 2013 he released El Rancho Azul via Red House Records, which featured the single, "I Lie When I Drink" (which has become his signature song), helped launch Ameripolitan Music, made his first appearance on Austin City Limits (PBS), and he bought his first little honky-tonk, "The Little Longhorn Saloon" in Austin, TX (home of "Chicken $#!+ Bingo").

In February 2014, his segment on "The Sun Sessions" aired on PBS nationally.  He appeared on the Late Show with David Letterman, performing "I Lie When I Drink" in early February.  In mid-February he took part in the 1st Annual Ameripolitan Awards Show. In July, The Truckin' Sessions Trilogy was released by Red River Entertainment, and he bought his second small honky-tonk, "The Big T Roadhouse" in St. Hedwig, TX (where "Chicken $#!+ Bingo" is now a tradition, as well). In November he appeared on the NPR show Wait Wait... Don't Tell Me!

In 2015 he toured in January with The Reverend Horton Heat as part of The BADDEST of The BAD Tour, in February he took part in the 2nd Annual Ameripolitan Awards show at The Paramount Theater in Austin, TX.  In March, he appeared on Jimmy Kimmel Live! (ABC) sitting in with the house band on a night the show broadcast from Austin during South by Southwest.  In early April, his first performance on Mountain Stage (NPR) aired nationally. In late May, The Truckin' Sessions, Vol. 3 was released as a stand-alone mid-line title in the US via Red River Entertainment and in Europe via Continental Record Services/CRS. His new studio album, Call Me Insane was produced by Lloyd Maines (of The Flatlanders, etc.) and was released worldwide June 9 via Red House/Ameripolitan Records.  The Call Me Insane Tour "officially" kicked off on June 13 at The Broken Spoke, in Austin, TX.  Also in June, he appeared as part of a segment on The Bachlorette (ABC) on June 15. The following weekend he & His Lone Stars began touring nationally to support the album's release, selling out shows in Wichita, KS, Lincoln, NE, Minneapolis, MN, Columbus, OH, Cambridge, MA, etc. Segments/sessions for Daytrotter, Music City Roots, Music Fog, Sirius/XM Outlaw Country, and Texas Music Scene also aired in July. In August, he and His Lone Stars toured primarily in Texas, with highlights being The Lone Star Beer Texas Heritage Festival shows in San Antonio, Houston, Dallas, and Austin. The film Two Step also opened in New York, NY and Los Angeles, CA - in which Dale played a bartender.  In September and October, he & His Lone Stars performed at The National Folk Festival, the Bristol Rhythm & Roots Fest and some club dates including T Selma, NC before beginning a West Coast run in Columbia, MO at Blues N Blues N BBQ Fest that included sold out shows in Huntington Beach, CA; Seattle, WA; Bozeman, MT; and Denver, CO. The film "Lazer Team" (Rooster Teeth) premiered in Austin, TX - Dale plays a sportscaster.  In mid-October, the new album Call Me Insane reached #1 on the Roots Music Report's Top 50 True Country Album Chart.  It peaked at #3 on the FAR Chart in early Summer, #4 on The Alternate Root Magazine'''s Root 66 Chart in September, and #7 (twice) on the Americana airplay chart (in mid-August and again in mid-September). In October, he filmed a starring role in an independent short movie project called "Yellow Rose".  In November he released a song, "The Bottle Never Let Me Down" on a "limited edition" Bloodshot Records vinyl-only 6-pack collection.

Personal life
In 2019, he opened the bar and restaurant 'Hernando's Hide-A-Way' in Memphis, Tennessee along with his fiancé, singer/songwriter Celine Lee. Celine and Dale began exclusively seeing each other while recording her album Cat-Eyes with friend and multimedia artist Kacie Marie. Celine and Dale also co-wrote her 2017 debut solo album of the same name Celine Lee''.

Dale Watson married Celine Lee on June 13, 2020.

Discography

Albums

Singles

(Selective)
 "Moments Passed Me By" (AM Pro) 
 "Nashville Rash" (Hightone)
 "One Tear at a Time" (Curb)
 "You Pour It On and I Pour It Down" (Curb)
 "I Lie When I Drink" (Red House)
 "The Bottle Never Let Me Down" (Bloodshot)

See also 
Music of Austin, Texas
Yellow Rose (film)

References

External links

Dale Watson
Dale Watson at HYENA Records

[ Dale Watson] on AllMusic Guide
Dale Watson - Interview and music from his Sun Sessions CD

Living people
1962 births
American male singer-songwriters
American country singer-songwriters
American alternative country singers
American country guitarists
American male guitarists
Singer-songwriters from Texas
Musicians from Birmingham, Alabama
Independent Music Awards winners
Guitarists from Alabama
Guitarists from Texas
20th-century American guitarists
Country musicians from Texas
Country musicians from Alabama
20th-century American male musicians
Singer-songwriters from Alabama